The Classic International was a professional golf tournament played at Copt Heath Golf Club in Knowle, Solihull, Warwickshire, England. The event was held twice, in 1970 and 1971. It was cancelled after organisers were unable to raise sufficient sponsorship to meet the British PGA minimum for the Order of Merit in 1972.

Winners

References

Golf tournaments in England
Recurring sporting events established in 1970
Recurring sporting events disestablished in 1971